Ragged Top is a  mountain summit located within Ironwood Forest National Monument, in Pima County of southern Arizona. Ragged Top is the biological and geological crown jewel of the monument for sightseeing and wildlife viewing, such as the Desert bighorn sheep and the desert tortoise. Ragged Top contains the greatest richness of species within the Sonoran Desert, including 401 plant species. Cathestecum erectum (common name false grama) is only found on Ragged Top in the state of Arizona. Saguaro and ironwood forests cover the bajadas surrounding this mountain. This geographical feature lies within the Gila River drainage basin. Four small arches are located on this mountain.

Climate
According to the Köppen climate classification system, Ragged Top is located in a hot arid climate zone.

Gallery

See also
 List of mountains in the United States

References

External links

 Weather forecast: National Weather Service

Sonoran Desert
Landforms of Pima County, Arizona
Mountains of Arizona
Volcanic plugs of the United States
North American 1000 m summits